The 2013 Magnolia Refinery oil spill occurred on March 9, 2013, when the line between a vital pump and an oil storage container broke. The split allowed a reported 15,000 barrels (1,788  m3) or 7,000 tonnes of crude oil into the Little Corney Creek. The creek runs towards the town of Magnolia, Arkansas. The leak was located at the Lion Oil and Trading & Transportation's Oil tank farm, between the settlements of Magnolia and El Dorado, owned by Delek's Logistic Unit. The United States Environmental Protection Agency (EPA) classified this pipeline rupture as a major spill because of the number of barrels estimated to have been spilled.

Geography 
The city of Magnolia is in Columbia County, Arkansas, United States and is the county seat of the county. According to the 2009 U.S. Census Bureau reports, the population of the city is 10,951.

Response 
Local authorities were called to action and responded quickly to clean up the spill and monitor the damage. Cleanup workers made use of a "vacuum truck", a vehicle used to suck up the oil and water from the creek quickly before making efforts to separate the two liquids. This process was employed to minimize environmental damage to the local shorelines. Beginning oil removal as fast as possible is beneficial to the overall results of the cleanup process. The farther into the environment that the oil seeps, the longer it will take to remove and the more integrated it will become into the food chain, becoming inaccessible.

The United States Environmental Protection Agency (EPA) was vital too in the cleanup process at Magnolia, Arkansas after this oil spill. Low temperatures and inclement weather initially delayed the cleanup procedures, but the EPA was eventually able to send out crews to various locations within the affected area.

Result 
Delek was required to pay for all cleanup operations after the spill and if the logistics unit corporation is confirmed to be guilty of negligence, for which they be fined accordingly.

See also 
 List of Oil Spills
 List of Pipeline Accidents in the United States
 Consortium Website
 Gulf of Mexico Research Initiative

References 

 Leak spills about 1,500 barrels of oil into Little Corney Creek
 Refiner Delek Cleaning Up 5,000-Barrel Spill in Arkansas Bayou

External links 
 Delek Logistics Unit
 Magnolia, Arkansas Map

2013 in the environment
Environment of Arkansas
Oil spills in the United States
Petroleum in Arkansas
Columbia County, Arkansas
2013 in Arkansas